John Kercheval Sidebottom OBE (1880–1954) was a British philatelist who signed the Roll of Distinguished Philatelists in 1949.

Selected publications
The Post by Road
History of Mileage Marks
Additional Halfpenny Tax
The Overland Mail (1948) (based on his collection of Thomas Waghorn covers)
The Government Dockwra (1951)

References

Signatories to the Roll of Distinguished Philatelists
1880 births
1954 deaths
British philatelists
Members of the Order of the British Empire